Gilloblennius abditus, known commonly as the obscure triplefin, is a species of triplefin blenny in the genus Gilloblennius. It was described by Graham Stuart Hardy in 1896. It is endemic to New Zealand where it has a disjunct distribution around North and South Islands where there are highly exposed rocky coasts.

References

Obscure triplefin
Fish described in 1986